Hoplitis anthocopoides is a species in the family Megachilidae ("leafcutter, mason, and resin bees, and allies"), in the order Hymenoptera ("ants, bees, wasps and sawflies").
The distribution range of Hoplitis anthocopoides includes Africa, Europe, Northern Asia (excluding China), and North America.

References

Further reading
 American Insects: A Handbook of the Insects of America North of Mexico, Ross H. Arnett. 2000. CRC Press.
 Krombein, Karl V., Paul D. Hurd Jr., David R. Smith, and B. D. Burks (1979). Catalog of Hymenoptera in America North of Mexico, vol. 2: Apocrita (Aculeata), xvi + 1199–2209.
 Ungricht, Stefan, Andreas Müller, and Silvia Dorn (2008). A taxonomic catalogue of the Palaearctic bees of the tribe Osmiini (Hymenoptera: Apoidea: Megachilidae).

External links

Megachilidae
Insects described in 1853